RMS Alaunia was an ocean liner built for the Cunard Line during the 1920s which served primarily on the Canadian route. She was requisitioned by the British Royal Navy during the Second World War and ultimately scrapped in 1957.

Background
Alaunia was built by John Brown & Company in Scotland to augment the transatlantic passenger fleet of the Cunard Line. The ship entered service in July 1925 and was primarily employed on the Canadian route running from Southampton to Quebec and Montreal during the warm weather months and Halifax during the winter. She was one of a number of so-called intermediate liners built with fuel economy in mind. Designed with a single stack and straight stem bow with four passenger decks, the ship was propelled by two screws powered by four double reduction geared steam turbine engines that gave her a service speed of fifteen knots. Safety features included twelve watertight compartments divided by eleven bulkheads and twenty-eight lifeboats.

Service
In August 1939 Alaunia was taken over by the Royal Navy for service as a troop transport and served in this capacity until 1944 when she was sold to the Royal Navy and refitted as a base repair ship at Gibraltar. Alaunia  was sold for scrap to the British Iron & Steel Corporation and subsequently broken up at Blyth, England in 1957.

References

External links
 Cabin Liners: Cunard's "A"-Class Liners 1924

1925 ships
Ships built on the River Clyde
Ships of the Cunard Line
Steamships of the United Kingdom
Troop ships of the Royal Navy
World War II Auxiliary cruisers of the Royal Navy